The Stolpersteine in Sázava lists the Stolpersteines in Sázava, Czech Republic. Stolpersteine is the German word for the memorial plates placed throughout Europe by German artist Gunter Demnig. They commemorate the fate of Nazi victims who were murdered, deported, exiled or driven to suicide. The stolpersteine in Sázava memorialize the three individuals who lived in the town who were deported and killed by the Nazi regime.

Generally, the stolpersteine are installed in front of the building where the victims had their last self-chosen residence. In Czech the word is Kameny zmizelých, or "stones of the disappeared".

Stolpersteine

The order of the list below is alphabetical according to the last name of the victim.

Dates of collocations 

The Stolpersteine in Sázava were installed by the artist on 20 September 2017.

See also 
 List of cities by country that have stolpersteine

External links

 stolpersteine.eu, Demnig's website
 holocaust.cz

References

Sázava
Monuments and memorials